Jayaben is an Indian name. It may refer to:

Jayaben Desai, Uk trade unionist
Jayaben Shah, Indian politician
Jayaben Thakkar, Indian politician